Cassigerinellidae is an extinct family of foraminifera belonging to the superfamily Guembelitrioidea and the suborder Globigerinina.

Genera
It includes the genera Cassigerinella and Riveroinella.

References

External links
 
 Foraminiferida
 Chapter 18: Taxonomy, Biostratigraph, and Phylogeny Of Oligocene Cassigerinella, Published: January 31, 2018

Foraminifera families
Globigerinina